Bagh Bid-e Sofla (also Romanized as Bāgh Bīd-e Soflá; also known as Bāb Bīd-e Soflá (Persian: باب بيدسفلي), Bāb Bīd-e Pā’īn, and Bābīd-e Soflá) is a village in Javaran Rural District, Hanza District, Rabor County, Kerman Province, Iran. At the 2006 census, its population was 61, in 14 families.

References 

Populated places in Rabor County